Real Esteli may refer to:

 Real Estelí Baloncesto, a Nicaraguan basketball team
 Real Estelí FC, a Nicaraguan association football team